Cucumber yellows virus (CuYV) is a species of virus that infects plants, specifically the cucumber and melon. It is transmitted by the greenhouse whitefly. The cucumber yellows virus genome was completely sequenced in 2003.

References

External links 
 ICTVdb Virus Description

Closteroviridae
Viral plant pathogens and diseases
Infraspecific virus taxa